Lieutenant-Colonel John Elliot  (1765 – 27 March 1829) was a porter brewer who was lieutenant-colonel of the Westminster Volunteer Cavalry. He was head of the Elliott and Co. brewery of Pimlico, and treasurer of Westminster Hospital.

Life 

John Elliot was born to George Elliot and Margaret (Grant) Elliot. In 1804, he married Eliza Lettsom at St Margaret's, Westminster. Eliza was the youngest daughter of John Coakley Lettsom. Together they had fifteen children and Sir Henry Miers Elliot is one of them who went on to become Foreign Secretary to the Government of India. Among his other children to have served in India, George Elliot served in Bombay Cavalry, William served in Madras Civil Service while Charles Morgan F.R.S served as Major Madras Engineers.

He died on 27 March 1829 at Pimlico Lodge, Westminster.

References

Westminster Hospital
People from Westminster
1765 births
1829 deaths
Fellows of the Royal Society
Westminster Dragoons officers
English brewers